The Deed of Andreas Harmer (German: Die Tat des Andreas Harmer) is a 1930 Austrian silent crime film directed by Alfred Deutsch-German and starring Oskar Marion, Tala Birell and Attila Hörbiger. The film's sets were designed by the art director Emil Stepanek.

Cast
 Arthur von Duniecki as 	Hofrat Othmar Valentin
 Tala Birell as 	Othmars Valentin's Gattin
 Gina Puch-Klitsch as 	Fritzi, Othmar Valentin's Tochter
 Attila Hörbiger as 	Marquese Robert Gomez
 Oskar Marion as Andreas Harmer
 Paula Pfluger as 	Emilie Harmer
 Annie Rosar as Frau Enzesfelder
 Annie Markart as Paula Enzesfelder 
 Ly Corelly as 	Manuel Cortez
 Walter Huber as Der 'geflickte Karl'
 Roman Winter as 	Rüdiger von Pollatschek
 Kurt Doehn as Alonso, Robert Gomez' brother
 Polizeihund Lux as 	Polizeihund

References

Bibliography 
 Von Dassanowsky, Robert. Austrian Cinema: A History. McFarland, 2005.

External links 
 

1930 films
Austrian crime films
1930 crime films
1930s German-language films
Films directed by Alfred Deutsch-German
Austrian black-and-white films
Austrian silent films
Sascha-Film films